Route nationale 56, RN56 or N56, is a 26 km long former route nationale (national road) linking Macheren to Sarralbe in the Grand-Est region of France. Reforms in 2004 transferred responsibility for its maintenance to the department of Moselle. Losing its national route status, the road was renumbered D 656. Its terminuses are the D 603 near Macheren to the northwest, and the D 661 near Sarralbe in the southeast.

Towns along the route include:

 Macheren (km 3)
 Barst (km 9)
 Cappel (km 10)
 Hoste-Bas (km 12)
 Puttelange-aux-Lacs (km 17)
 Richeling (km 20)
 Sarralbe (km 26)

References

External links 

 An approximate trace of the D 656 road on Google Maps

056